Sergey Savchenko (born August 25, 1949) is a Ukrainian artist, a representative of abstract expressionism. Works in the field of painting, graphics, sculpture and monumental art. Member of the Odessa nonconformist movement. Honored Artist of Ukraine.

Biography 
Serhiy Savchenko was born on August 25, 1949 in Odessa.

He received his art education at the Grekov Odessa Art School from 1969–1974. His teacher of painting was Adolf Loza.

He began his creative activity in the 1970s, exhibition one in 1976. In the early 1980s he joined the group of Odessa nonconformists. Since the late 1980s he has been participating in exhibitions of contemporary art in Ukraine and abroad.

In 1988 the artist became a member of the Artists' Union of the USSR, later the National Union of Artists of Ukraine.

Savchenko is one of the founders of the National Association of Artists (1993), creative association "Boat" (1992) and creative association "Mamay" (1998), honorary member of the National University of Kyiv-Mohyla Academy, Honored Artist of Ukraine (2009), member of the Shevchenko National Prize Committee of Ukraine (2016–2019).

Lives and works in Odessa.

Work 
Abstraction has the opportunity to enter the emotional space in which pure subtle energies roar, and art appears as a reflection, as it should be, clear and revealed at the level of impulsive entry into the image on the verge of possible insight.

- Sergey Savchenko, artist

Collections 
Museums Collections

 National Art Museum of Ukraine (Kyiv, Ukraine)
 National University of Kyiv-Mohyla Academy (Kyiv, Ukraine)
 Museum of Modern Art of Ukraine (Kyiv, Ukraine)
 Odessa Art Museum (Odessa, Ukraine)
 Museum of Odessa Modern Art (Odessa, Ukraine)
 Ivano-Frankivsk Regional Art Museum (Ivano-Frankivsk, Ukraine)
 Khmelnytskyi Museum of Ukrainian Contemporary Art (Khmelnytskyi, Ukraine)
 Kaniv Museum of Taras Shevchenko (Kaniv, Ukraine)
 Lviv Art Palace (Lviv, Ukraine)
 Korsak's Museum of Ukrainian Modern Art (Lutsk, Ukraine)
 Novosibirsk Art Museum (Novosibirsk, Russia)
 Ukrainian Institute of Modern Art (Chicago, USA)

Awards 

 2002 - International Biennial of Contemporary Graphics (Novosibirsk, Russia)
 1989 - Laureate of the UAZIS Award (Ukrainian Association for the Protection of the Historical Environment), Impreza International Biennale (Ivano-Frankivsk, Ukraine)

References 

1949 births
Artists from Odesa
Ukrainian contemporary artists
Living people